Gené may refer to:

 People
 Giuseppe Gené (1800–1847), Italian naturalist and author
 Jordi Gené (born 1970), Spanish racing driver
 Marc Gené (born 1974), Spanish racing driver

 Places
 Gené, Maine-et-Loire, a commune in the Maine-et-Loire department in France

See also 
 Gene (disambiguation)
 Genet (disambiguation)